Gliding is a recreational activity and competitive air sport in which pilots fly unpowered aircraft known as gliders or sailplanes.

Gliding  may also refer to:
 Gliding flight, flight in the absence of thrust
 Gliding motility of microbes.
 Gliding (vehicle), a natural deceleration of vehicle turning off the engine and type of fuel economy-maximizing behavior.
 Hang gliding, an air sport in which a pilot flies a light and unmotorized foot-launchable aircraft called a hang glider
 Paragliding, an air sport in which a pilot flies a foot-launched unmotorized aircraft with a frameless wing called a paraglider
 Ski Gliding or speed riding, an air sport in which a pilot flies a small fabric wing whilst on skis
 List of airline flights that required gliding

See also
 Flying and gliding animals
 Glide (disambiguation)
 Glider (disambiguation)